is a Japanese professional footballer who plays as a defensive midfielder for Kyoto Sanga, on loan from Urawa Red Diamonds.

Career
After attending Kanagawa University, Kaneko joined Shonan Bellmare for 2018 season.

Club statistics
.

References

External links
 Daiki Kaneko at j-league.or.jp 
 Daiki Kaneko at jleague.jp (archive) 
 Daiki Kaneko at Kyoto Sanga (archived) 

1998 births
Living people
Association football people from Tokyo
Japanese footballers
J1 League players
Shonan Bellmare players
Urawa Red Diamonds players
Kyoto Sanga FC players
Association football midfielders